I Promise You may refer to:

 "I Promise You (Get Ready)", a 1987 song by Samantha Fox
 "I Promise You (I.P.U.)", a 2018 song by Wanna One
 "I Promise You", a song composed by Harold Arlen and Johnny Mercer for the 1944 film Here Come the Waves
 "I Promise You", a song by Selena Gomez & the Scene from Kiss & Tell, 2009
 "I Promise You (song)", a 2015 song by Mohsen Yeganeh